A Challenge for the Actor is a bestselling acting textbook by the actress and teacher Uta Hagen (Scribner Publishing, 1991), used in many acting classes. Taking the concept of "substitution" from her previous book, Respect for Acting, she renamed it "transference".

Other useful sections in this book are the exercises that Uta Hagen has created and elaborated to help the actor learn their craft, such as developing the actor's physical destination in a role; making changes in the self serviceable in the creation of a character; recreating physical sensations; bringing the outdoors on stage; finding occupation while waiting; talking to oneself and the audience; and employing historical imagination.

References

Non-fiction books about acting
1991 non-fiction books